Doğanbeyli can refer to:

 Doğanbeyli, Kemah
 Doğanbeyli, Tufanbeyli